The AA Seminole District is a district in Region III of the Virginia High School League.  The schools of the district are located in and around the Lynchburg Metro (Lynchburg, Virginia).  US 29, which passes through the area, is named the Seminole Trail through much of Virginia.  All current member schools have won at least one state championship in football since 1988. 

The Seminole District gained State-wide recognition in the mid-2010s during an ongoing court case between VHSL and Liberty Christian Academy.  The case went in favor of LCA, and the school became the first private institution to become a member of VHSL.  The Bulldogs soon after became the eighth member of the league.

Member schools

Amherst Lancers, Amherst
Brookville Bees, Lynchburg
E.C. Glass Hilltoppers, Lynchburg
Heritage Pioneers, Lynchburg
Jefferson Forest Cavaliers, Forest
Liberty Minutemen, Bedford
LCA Bulldogs, Lynchburg
Rustburg Red Devils, Rustburg

References

Virginia High School League